Sir Francis Godolphin MP (died 1640) was an English nobleman, politician, knight, and Member of Parliament.

Biography
Godolphin was the third son of Sir Francis Godolphin (1540–1608) and his first wife Margaret Killigrew. He represented St Ives in the Parliaments of 1624–5 and 1625, and Cornwall in that of 1626. He was also Recorder of Helston in 1620. He was still alive in 1637, and his will was proved on 2 May 1640.

Notes

References
 D Brunton & D H Pennington, Members of the Long Parliament (London: George Allen & Unwin, 1954)

Members of the pre-1707 English Parliament for constituencies in Cornwall
1640 deaths
Year of birth unknown
English MPs 1624–1625
English MPs 1625
English MPs 1626
Francis
Knights Bachelor
Governors of the Isles of Scilly